Research England is a part of United Kingdom Research and Innovation (UKRI) that oversees the functions of UKRI in relation to university research and knowledge transfer in England. This includes:
 providing funding to English universities for research and knowledge exchange activities
 developing and implementing the Research Excellence Framework (REF) in partnership with the UK Higher Education funding bodies
 developing the Knowledge Exchange Framework (KEF)
 overseeing the sustainability the Higher Education research base in England
 managing the £900 million UK Research Partnership Investment Fund
 administering the Higher Education Innovation Fund (HEIF)

See also
Higher Education Funding Council for England

References

Higher education organisations based in the United Kingdom
Innovation in the United Kingdom
Research and development in the United Kingdom